Bashaw  is a town in central Alberta, Canada. It is at the junction of Highway 21 and Highway 53.

The community has the name of Eugene Bashaw, an original owner of the town site.

Post office dates from 1910.

Demographics 

In the 2016 Census of Population conducted by Statistics Canada, the Town of Bashaw recorded a population of 830 living in 379 of its 418 total private dwellings, a  change from its 2011 population of 873.

See also 
List of communities in Alberta
List of towns in Alberta

References

External links 

1911 establishments in Alberta
Towns in Alberta